Kauko Kalervo Nyström (3 March 1933 – 1 February 2009) was a Finnish pole vaulter who won a bronze medal at the 1962 European Championships.

Nyström retired due to an ankle injury and later worked as a watchmaker and sports official. He died from injuries sustained in a traffic accident, which occurred 10 days earlier. He had an elder brother Keijo, also a sportsman and watchmaker.

References

1933 births
2009 deaths
Finnish male pole vaulters
European Athletics Championships medalists
People from Somero
Sportspeople from Southwest Finland